The Dead Town is the fifth and final novel of Dean Koontz's Frankenstein series.

Releases
The book reached #1 on the New York Times Paperback Bestseller list.

Also, limited lettered and numbered hardcover editions were published by Charnel House.

References

External links
Dean Koontz's Frankenstein at his official website

2011 American novels
Novels by Dean Koontz
American biopunk novels
Frankenstein novels
Bantam Books books